Every Woman Knows a Secret is a 1999 British television drama series written by William Humble based on the 1996 novel of the same name by Rosie Thomas. The series aired on ITV from 18 March to 1 April 1999 is both set and filmed in Berkshire.

Plot
The series stars Siobhan Redmond as Jess, a woman whose son Danny dies in a drunk driving accident.

Cast
Siobhan Redmond as Jess
Paul Bettany as Rob
Miles Anderson as Ian
Claire Cox as Beth
Serena Evans as Lizzie
Tom Chadbon as James
Jolyon Baker as Samantha
Danny Erskine as Prison Boy
Sarah Grochala as Nurse
Sam Loggin as Catherine

Episodes

References

External links
 

1999 British television series debuts
1999 British television series endings
1990s British drama television series
ITV television dramas
1990s British television miniseries
English-language television shows
Serial drama television series
Television shows based on British novels
Television shows set in Berkshire